was a  after Heiji and before Ōhō. This period spanned the years from January 1160 through September 1161.

Change of era
 February 9, 1160 : The new era name was created to mark an event or a number of events. The previous era ended and a new one commenced in Heiji 2, on the 10th day of the 1st month.

Events of the Eiryaku era
 1160 (Eiryaku 1):  Minamoto no Yoshitomo (1123–1160), was killed in a campaign to overthrow the imperial chancellor, Taira no Kiyomori. Yoshitomo's wife, Tokiwa Gozen was compelled to flee Kyoto with her three sons.

Notes

References
 Brown, Delmer M. and Ichirō Ishida, eds. (1979).  Gukanshō: The Future and the Past. Berkeley: University of California Press. ;  OCLC 251325323
 Nussbaum, Louis-Frédéric and Käthe Roth. (2005).  Japan encyclopedia. Cambridge: Harvard University Press. ;  OCLC 58053128
 Titsingh, Isaac. (1834). Nihon Odai Ichiran; ou,  Annales des empereurs du Japon.  Paris: Royal Asiatic Society, Oriental Translation Fund of Great Britain and Ireland. OCLC 5850691
 Varley, H. Paul. (1980). A Chronicle of Gods and Sovereigns: Jinnō Shōtōki of Kitabatake Chikafusa. New York: Columbia University Press. ;  OCLC 6042764

External links
 National Diet Library, "The Japanese Calendar" -- historical overview plus illustrative images from library's collection

Japanese eras
1160s in Japan